John Richards may refer to:

Law
 John Richards (Salem witch trials) (died 1694), one of the judges of the Salem witch trials
 John Richards (Attorney General) (1790–1872), Irish judge
 John E. Richards (1856–1932), California Supreme Court justice
 John K. Richards (1856–1909), Ohio Attorney General
 John Goddard Richards (1794–?), Irish barrister and justice of the peace

Music
 Johnny Richards (1911–1968), jazz musician and composer
 John Richards (musician) (born 1966), British musician and academic
 John Richards (radio personality), radio disc jockey at KEXP in Seattle

Politics
 John Richards (Pennsylvania politician) (1753–1822), United States congressman from Pennsylvania
 John Richards (New York politician) (1765–1850), United States congressman from New York
 John Richards (British politician) (1780–1847), Member of the House of Commons from England
 John Fletcher Richards (1818–?), Wisconsin state assemblyman
 John L. Richards, mayor of South Norwalk, Connecticut in 1886
 John Richards (Australian politician) (c. 1842–1913), writer on mining and politician in South Australia
 John Richards (Canadian politician) (1857–1917), farmer and political figure on Prince Edward Island
 John Gardiner Richards Jr. (1864–1941), governor of South Carolina
 John Richards (scholar) (born 1944), Canadian politician and scholar

Religion
 John Harold Richards (1869–1952), Anglican priest
 John Richards (bishop of St David's) (1901–1990), Bishop of St David's
 John Richards (bishop of Ebbsfleet) (1933–2003), Bishop of Ebbsfleet

Sports
 John R. Richards (1875–1947), American football coach at the University of Wisconsin–Madison and Ohio State University
 John Richards (racing driver) (born 1948), American former racing driver
 John Richards (footballer) (born 1950), English footballer

Other
 John Richards (soldier) (1669–1709), Irish artillery officer
 John Richards (actor), English stage actor 
 John Inigo Richards (1731–1810), English landscape painter
 John Morgan Richards (1841–1918), American businessman and entrepreneur
 John Francisco Richards II (1896–1918), World War I aviator
 John Richards (Royal Marines officer) (1927–2004), lieutenant-general of the Queen's household in the United Kingdom
 John Baker Richards, governor of the Bank of England, 1826–1828
 John F. Richards (1938–2007), historian of South Asia
 John S. Richards, American librarian
 John Richards, founder and chairman of the Apostrophe Protection Society
 John Richards, Australian writer and podcaster, known for Boxcutters, Outland, and Night Terrace

See also
 Jonathan Richards (disambiguation)
 Jack Richards (disambiguation)
 John Richard (born 1934), Canadian Chief Justice